Synemon directa, the white-banded sun moth, is a moth in the Castniidae family. It is found in Australia, including Western Australia.

The larvae feed on Lepidosperma gladiatum.

References

Moths described in 1877
Castniidae